The 2011 Plateau State gubernatorial election was the 7th gubernatorial election of Plateau State. Held on April 26, 2011, the People's Democratic Party nominee Jonah David Jang won the election, defeating Pauline Tallen of the Labour Party.

Results 
A total of 9 candidates contested in the election. Jonah David Jang from the People's Democratic Party won the election, defeating Pauline Tallen from the Labour Party. Valid votes was 1,399,418.

References 

Plateau State gubernatorial elections
Plateau gubernatorial
April 2011 events in Nigeria